Akçakoyun (literally "white sheep") is a village in Yenice District of Çanakkale Province, Turkey. Its population is 898 (2021). Before the 2013 reorganisation, it was a town (belde). Akçakoyun is situated to west of Kalkım pond and to the south of Agonya creek.

The history of Akçakoyun is somewhat intermingled with that of Kalkım, a town to the east of Akçakoyun. The area around Akçakoyun, then named Agonya was an important ironworking center during the ancient ages. During the Turkish rule, originally a single settlement, it was split into two, namely Kalkım and Akçakoyun. In 1995, the settlement was declared a seat of township.  Main economic sector of the town is fruit farming. Forestry, animal breeding and hunting tourism are other sectors.

References

Villages in Yenice District, Çanakkale